The Summer Demo of 2006 was the second self-released album from Josephine Collective. The songs were recorded over the course of a summer by Brandon Paddock.

Track listing
"Living"
"Lye"
"Hey Its Okay"
"I Don't Wanna Die"
"Eraser Falls"
"Beautiful"
"Ivy League"
"Courage (I Was Right About You)"
"Unicorn Lollipop Too"
"It's Like Rain"
"Let Go"
"Your Days Are Numbered"
"Barry, You're Dead"
"(I Can't) Imagine"
"Clementine"
"We Are the Air"
"Leave Me Love"
"Pray for Rain (The Phoenix)"
"We Killed the American Dream"

2006 albums
Self-released albums